Rostellariella martinii, common name the Martini's tibia, is a species of sea snail, a marine gastropod mollusk in the family Rostellariidae within the Stromboidea, the true conchs and their allies.

Description
The size of the shell varies between 50 mm and 200 mm.

Distribution
This marine species occurs between Taiwan and Borneo.

References

External links
 

Rostellariidae
Gastropods described in 1877